Kulnura is a suburb of the Central Coast region of New South Wales, Australia, located north of Mangrove Mountain along George Downes Drive. It is within  local government area. Kulnura's name is an Aboriginal word meaning "in sight of the sea" or "up in the clouds", it was named in 1914 by a meeting of the early pioneers Messrs Archibold, Collins, Gatley, Penn, Young, Williams and Gibson. Its population of approximately 600 people rely mostly on the town's fruit and cattle industries for income, however many commute to regional centres of Gosford, Wyong and even to Sydney for work. It is also home to the biggest catchment area on the Central Coast, Mangrove Creek Dam which has a capacity of 190 000 ML, and has a free tourist kiosk on the site.  "Mangrove Mountain Bottlers Pty Ltd" bottle still water at their plant at Kulnura, as well as for private label mass-retailers, such as 7–11.

Another one of Kulnura's attractions is the Paintball Place, which holds paintball skirmishes for people over 16.

District
Kulnura extends from the intersection of Bloodtree Road and George Downes Drive in the south, to the Great Northern Road in the north, to include the Mangrove Creek reservoir in the west, to down Bumble Hill Road in the east and to Red Hill Road in the southeast. Map of Kulnura in Google Maps

Kulnura General Store-café, petrol station and a bottle shop are located just opposite Kulnura Hall at the intersection of Greta Road with George Downes Drive.

Kulnura's One Stop convenience store is also a popular resting place for passing motorcyclists and tourists.

Kulnura Public School is situated at 9 Williams Road.

Festival
Every year Kulnura is host to the Bloodtree Festival, which is a celebration of life in the Mangrove Mountain area. It has been running for the past five years at Kulnura Oval, adjacent to Kulnura Hall.

References

Suburbs of the Central Coast (New South Wales)